Ruggero, the Italian equivalent of Roger, may refer to:

Ruggero I of Sicily (1031–1101) Norman king of Sicily
Ruggero Berlam (1854–1920), Italian architect
Ruggero Bonghi (1826–1895), Italian scholar, writer and politician
Ruggero Borghi (born 1970), former Italian professional road bicycle racer
Ruggero Cobelli (1838–1921), Italian entomologist
Ruggero Deodato (born 1939), controversial Italian film director, actor and screenwriter, best known for directing horror films
Ruggero Ferrario (born 1897), Italian racing cyclist and Olympic champion in track cycling
Ruggero J. Aldisert (born 1919), judge on the United States Court of Appeals for the Third Circuit
Ruggero Leoncavallo (1857–1919), Italian opera composer
Ruggero Luigi Emidio Antici Mattei (1811–1883), Italian prelate of the Roman Catholic Church
Ruggero Maccari (1919–1989), Italian screenwriter
Ruggero Maregatti (1905–1963), Italian athlete who competed mainly in the 100 metres
Ruggero Marzoli (born 1976), Italian professional road bicycle racer
Ruggero Mastroianni (1929–1996), Italian film editor
Ruggero Oddi (1864–1913), Italian physiologist and anatomist
Pier Ruggero Piccio (1880–1965), Italian aviator and the founding Chief of Staff of the Italian Air Force
Ruggero Raimondi (born 1941), Italian Bass-Baritone opera singer and sometime screen actor
Ruggero Santilli (born 1935), Italian-American physicist and a proponent of fringe theories
Ruggero Verity, Italian entomologist who specialised in butterflies

See also
Ruggiero
Castel Ruggero, an Italian village in Campania

Italian masculine given names